"Beautiful" is a song by South Korean boy band Wanna One. The song serves as the lead single of their re-issue album, 1-1=0 (Nothing Without You).

Composition
Musically, "Beautiful" was described as a midtempo EDM-pop ballad containing woozy synths and a steady beat. The song's lyrics expresses the feelings of fear, loneliness and longing coming from being alone.

Music video
The music video is directed by Yong Yi, who has directed several South Korean films. Using the song to propel the storyline, the 8-minute long "movie" music video  depicts a storyline where members Kang Daniel and Ong Seongwoo portray brothers who were separated in childhood and began searching for one another after they grew up, ultimately reuniting in an orphanage where Kang resides. Other members played supporting and minor roles in the video; Hwang Minhyun plays Ong's classmate at the police academy, Park Jihoon plays Kang's childhood friend and the rest plays Kang's friends at the orphanage. The video ends with trouble following the pair of brothers and their friends, culminating in ruin for both.

Chart performance
Upon release, "Beautiful" charted atop on real-time charts of six music sites: Melon, Genie, Bugs, Mnet, Naver, and Soribada. It recorded highest number of unique listeners in the first hour on a song on Melon since chart reforms, breaking the record previously held by Wanna One's own song, "Energetic". The single peaked at number one on Gaon Digital Chart, becoming the group's second chart-topper.

Charts

Weekly chart

Monthly chart

Release history

Sales

Accolades

References

External links 
 
 

Songs about loneliness
Korean-language songs
2017 songs
Wanna One songs
Gaon Digital Chart number-one singles
Billboard Korea K-Pop number-one singles